Goundo Samake (born 2 May 1992) is a Malian footballer who plays as a goalkeeper. She has been a member of the Mali women's national team.

International career
Samake capped for Mali at senior level during the 2016 Africa Women Cup of Nations.

References

1992 births
Living people
Malian women's footballers
Mali women's international footballers
Women's association football goalkeepers
Malian expatriate footballers
Malian expatriates in Equatorial Guinea
Expatriate women's footballers in Equatorial Guinea
21st-century Malian people